Alasmidonta is a genus of freshwater mussels, aquatic bivalve mollusks in the family Unionidae, the river mussels.

Species within the genus Alasmodonta
 Altamaha arcmussel, Alasmidonta arcula (I. Lea, 1838)
 Cumberland elktoe, Alasmidonta atropurpurea (Rafinesque, 1831)
 Dwarf wedgemussel, Alasmidonta heterodon (I. Lea, 1830)    
 Elktoe, Alasmidonta marginata Say, 1818 
 Coosa elktoe, Alasmidonta mccordi Athearn, 1964 
 Appalachian elktoe, Alasmidonta raveneliana (I. Lea, 1834)
 Carolina elktoe, Alasmidonta robusta Clarke, 1981
 Southern elktoe, Alasmidonta triangulata (I. Lea, 1858)
 Triangle floater, Alasmidonta undulata (Say, 1817)
 Brook floater, Alasmidonta varicosa (Lamarck, 1819)
 Slippershell mussel, Alasmidonta viridis (Rafinesque, 1820)
 Ochlockonee arcmussel, Alasmidonta wrightiana (Walker, 1901)

Gallery

References 

 

 
Bivalve genera
Taxa named by Thomas Say
Taxonomy articles created by Polbot